Kader may refer to:

Kader (film), a 2006 Turkish drama film
Kader Group, a toy manufacturer of Hong Kong

People with the given name
Kader Abdolah (born 1954), Iranian-Dutch writer, poet and columnist. 
Kader Asmal (1934–2011), South African politician
Kader Attia (born 1970), Algerian-French artist
Kader Dost (born 2000), Turkish female race walker
Kader Hançar (born 1999), Turkish women's footballer
Kader Keïta (born 2000), Ivorian footballer
Kader Khan (1937–2018), Indian actor, screenwriter, comedian, and film director
Kader Nouni (born 1976), French tennis umpire

See also